Tillandsia seideliana is a species in the genus Tillandsia. This species is endemic to Brazil.

References

seideliana
Flora of Brazil